8X or 8-X may refer to:

8x, or eight times in multiplication
8X, code name for Enhanced Imaging System
8X, abbreviation for Octuple scull
Precorrin-8X methylmutase
South African Class 8X 2-8-0 locomotive
8X Bayshore; see  List of San Francisco Municipal Railway lines
Typ 8X; internal designation for  Audi A1
HTC Windows Phone 8X, a Windows Phone 8 device produced by HTC.

See also
X8 (disambiguation)